Norbert Gyömbér (born 3 July 1992) is a Slovak professional footballer who plays as a defender for Serie A club Salernitana and the Slovakia national team.

Club career

Dukla Banská Bystrica
Born in Revúca, Gyömbér started playing football with club MFK Revúca, before moving to the youth team of Corgoň Liga club FK Dukla Banská Bystrica in 2006. Norbert made his professional debut with Dukla Banská Bystrica on 1 October 2011 in a league match against MFK Ružomberok. On 25 May 2012, Gyömbér was voted by Dukla Banská Bystrica's fans as player of the season, despite starting in just 18 league matches. He was also named Revelation of the 2011–12 Corgoň Liga's season in July 2012, after his successful first season with FK Dukla Banská Bystrica.

Catania
Calcio Catania officially agreed to the permanent transfer of midfielder Norbert Gyömbér from Dukla Banská Bystrica during the 2013 January transfer window, though the transfer was not officially be completed until 1 July 2013. The 20-year-old signed a 4.5-year deal at the Stadio Angelo Massimino, but finished the 2012–13 season with the top-flight Slovakian side.

Roma
On 18 August 2015, Gyömbér joined Roma on a one-year loan, in which the signing was made permanent on 21 June 2016 for €1.5 million.

Pescara
On 15 August 2016, Gyömbér joined Pescara on a season-long loan. He first appeared in a Cup match against Frosinone in August, however, after only 5 games, he fractured his tibula in a 49th minute of a match against Lazio Roma in September.

Although between December 2016 and February 2017 he appeared in 6 of Pescara's 10 matches (out of 2 due to a minor injury), rumours have surfaced about disagreements with some of his teammates and consequently, he was removed from the squad by club's disciplinary action in mid-February. However, according to Gyömbér, this rumour was "not true at all" and the real cause were disagreements with the coach of Pescara at the time, Massimo Oddo, who shortly after replaced by Zdeněk Zeman after a series of unsuccessful results, which Gyömbér claims to be one of the reasons for tensions. He revealed these claims in an interview on 21 March 2017, in a national team camp in Senec, prior to the FIFA World Cup qualifier against Malta.

Terek Grozny
On 16 February 2017, he joined the Russian Premier League club FC Terek Grozny on loan until the end of 2016–17 season.

Perugia
On 14 August 2018, he signed a three-year contract with Serie B club Perugia.

Salernitana
On 12 September 2020, he joined Salernitana on a three-year contract.

International career 
Gyömbér was selected in Slovakia's squad for UEFA Euro 2016, making two appearances as Slovakia reached the round of 16.

Pavel Hapal era
After the arrival of the Czech-native Pavel Hapal, Gyömbér lost his spot in the national team, as early as November 2018, failing to regain it in March 2019. He managed to make a national team come-back in October 2019 for a qualifier against Wales, when it was required to fill the role of a second centre back, as Denis Vavro had suffered a yellow card suspension. He played for the national team after over a year and his gameplay was seen generally positively, mainly for his uncompromising play, as he was tackled harshly on numerous occasions. His gameplay, however, caused him to be sanctioned with two yellow cards.

Later appearances
In 2021 and 2022, Gyömbér only appeared in the national team on two occasions in the unsuccessful UEFA Nations League campaign. After the arrival of Francesco Calzona, Gyömbér was first nominated in March 2023 to kick-off UEFA Euro 2024 qualifying short after a 3-month injury-caused absence from club football.

Personal life 
He belongs to the Hungarian minority in Slovakia.

Honours
Slovakia
King's Cup: 2018

Individual
Peter Dubovský Award: 2013

References

External links
 Calcio Catania profile
 

1992 births
Living people
People from Revúca
Sportspeople from the Banská Bystrica Region
Slovak people of Hungarian descent
Slovak footballers
Association football midfielders
Slovakia international footballers
Slovakia under-21 international footballers
Slovakia youth international footballers
UEFA Euro 2016 players
Slovak Super Liga players
Serie A players
Serie B players
Russian Premier League players
FK Dukla Banská Bystrica players
Catania S.S.D. players
A.S. Roma players
Delfino Pescara 1936 players
FC Akhmat Grozny players
S.S.C. Bari players
A.C. Perugia Calcio players
U.S. Salernitana 1919 players
Slovak expatriate footballers
Slovak expatriate sportspeople in Italy
Expatriate footballers in Italy
Slovak expatriate sportspeople in Russia
Expatriate footballers in Russia